Suryendu Dutta is a Professor in the Department of Earth Sciences at IIT Bombay. His research interests include plant biomarkers in sediments and crude oils, plant metabolites, shale gas, molecular taphonomy, protein diagenesis, hydrocarbon source rock characterization and lignin metabolism. Dutta secured his M Sc degree in applied geology in 2001 from Jadavpur University, Kolkata, M Tech degree in geoexploration in 2003 from IIT Bombay and PhD degree in 2006 from RWTH Aachen University, Germany.

Honours and awards
The honours and awards conferred on Dutta include:
 Shanti Swarup Bhatnagar Prize for Science and Technology in 2020 in Earth, Atmosphere, Ocean and Planetary Sciences for his contributions to the understanding of evolution of plantterpenoids
 SwarnaJayanti Fellowship Award, 2017
 National Geoscience Award, 2017
 Prof S P Sukhatme Excellence in Teaching Award, 2017
 NASI-SCOPUS Young Scientist Award, 2014
 INSA-DFG Exchange Fellowship, 2013

References

External links
ORCID

Recipients of the Shanti Swarup Bhatnagar Award in Earth, Atmosphere, Ocean & Planetary Sciences
Living people
Indian earth scientists
Year of birth missing (living people)
Scientists from West Bengal